The Highlands and Islands is one of the eight electoral regions of the Scottish Parliament, created in 1999. Eight of the parliament's first past the post constituencies are sub-divisions of the region and it elects seven of the 56 additional-member Members of the Scottish Parliament (MSPs).

The name Highlands and Islands is much older than the electoral region. The Highlands and Islands area has a large area of overlap with the Scottish Highlands, and the two names are often regarded as representing the same area.

The Highlands and Islands region is the largest of the eight electoral regions in terms of area, but the smallest in terms of population and electorate. It has boundaries with the North East Scotland, Mid Scotland and Fife and the West Scotland electoral regions.

Constituencies and council areas

2011– 

As a result of the First Periodic Review of Scottish Parliament Boundaries the boundaries of the region and constituencies were redrawn for the 2011 Scottish Parliament election.

1999–2011 
The constituencies were created in 1999 with the names and boundaries of Westminster constituencies, as existing at that time. They covered all of four council areas, the Highland council area, Na h-Eileanan Siar (Western Isles council area),
the Orkney Isles council area and the Shetland Isles council area, and most of two others, the Argyll and Bute council area and the Moray council area:

A south-eastern portion of the Argyll and Bute area is covered by the Dumbarton constituency, which is in the West of Scotland region. An eastern portion of the Moray area is covered by the Gordon constituency, in the North East Scotland region.

Boundary changes

The Boundary Commission also recommended changes to the electoral regions used to elect "list" members of the Scottish Parliament. Highlands and Islands was amended so as to contain the newly redrawn constituencies of Argyll and Bute; Caithness, Sutherland and Ross; Inverness and Nairn; Moray; Na h-Eileanan an Iar; Orkney Islands; Shetland Islands; and Skye, Lochaber and Badenoch.

List of MSPs

Constituency MSPs

Regional list MSPs
N.B. This table is for presentation purposes only

Election results

2021 Scottish Parliament election

Constituency results
{| class=wikitable
!colspan=4 style=background-color:#f2f2f2|2021 Scottish Parliament election: Highlands and Islands
|-
! colspan=2 style="width: 200px"|Constituency
! style="width: 150px"|Elected member
! style="width: 300px"|Result

Additional Member results

2016 election
In the 2016 Scottish Parliament election the region elected MSPs as follows:
 7 Scottish National Party MSPs (six constituency members and one additional member)
 3 Conservative MSPs (all additional members)
 2 Liberal Democrat MSPs (both constituency members)
 2 Labour MSPs (both additional members)
 1 Green MSP (additional member)

Constituency results
{| class=wikitable
!colspan=4 style=background-color:#f2f2f2|2016 Scottish Parliament election: Highlands and Islands
|-
! colspan=2 style="width: 200px"|Constituency
! style="width: 150px"|Elected member
! style="width: 300px"|Result

Additional member results 
Elected candidates are highlighted in bold.

2011 election
In the 2011 Scottish Parliament election the region elected MSPs as follows:
 9 Scottish National Party MSPs (six constituency members and three additional members)
 2 Liberal Democrat MSPs (both constituency members)
 2 Labour MSPs (both additional members)
 2 Conservative MSPs (both additional members)

Constituency results
{| class=wikitable
!colspan=4 style=background-color:#f2f2f2|2011 Scottish Parliament election: Highlands and Islands
|-
! colspan=2 style="width: 200px"|Constituency
! style="width: 150px"|Elected member
! style="width: 300px"|Result

Additional member results 
{| class=wikitable
!colspan=8 style=background-color:#f2f2f2|2011 Scottish Parliament election: Highlands and Islands
|-
! colspan="2" style="width: 150px"|Party
! Elected candidates
! style="width: 40px"|Seats
! style="width: 40px"|+/−
! style="width: 50px"|Votes
! style="width: 40px"|%
! style="width: 40px"|+/−%
|-

2007 election
In the 2007 Scottish Parliament election the region elected MSPs as follows:

 6 Scottish National Party MSPs (four constituency MSPs and two additional members)
 4 Liberal Democrat MSPs (all constituency MSPs)
 3 Labour MSPs (all additional members)
 2 Conservative MSPs (both additional members)

Constituency results 
{| class=wikitable
!colspan=4 style=background-color:#f2f2f2|2007 Scottish Parliament election: Highlands and Islands
|-
! colspan=2 style="width: 200px"|Constituency
! style="width: 150px"|Elected member
! style="width: 300px"|Result

Additional member results 
{| class=wikitable
!colspan=8 style=background-color:#f2f2f2|2007 Scottish Parliament election: Highlands and Islands
|-
! colspan="2" style="width: 150px"|Party
! Elected candidates
! style="width: 40px"|Seats
! style="width: 40px"|+/−
! style="width: 50px"|Votes
! style="width: 40px"|%
! style="width: 40px"|+/−%
|-

2003 election 
In the 2003 Scottish Parliament election the region elected MSPs as follows:

 5 Liberal Democrat MSPs (all constituency MSPs)
 4 Scottish National Party MSPs (two constituency MSPs and two additional members)
 3 Labour MSPs (one constituency MSP and two additional members)
 2 Conservative MSPs (both additional members)
 1 Green MSP (additional member)

Constituency results 
{| class=wikitable
!colspan=4 style=background-color:#f2f2f2|2003 Scottish Parliament election: Highlands and Islands
|-
! colspan=2 style="width: 200px"|Constituency
! style="width: 150px"|Elected member
! style="width: 300px"|Result
 
 
 
 
 
 
 
 

Changes:
Margaret Ewing, Scottish National Party MSP for Moray, died on 21 March 2006. The by-election was won by Richard Lochhead of the SNP.

Additional member results 
{| class=wikitable
!colspan=8 style=background-color:#f2f2f2|2003 Scottish Parliament election: Highlands and Islands
|-
! colspan="2" style="width: 150px"|Party
! Elected candidates
! style="width: 40px"|Seats
! style="width: 40px"|+/−
! style="width: 50px"|Votes
! style="width: 40px"|%
! style="width: 40px"|+/−%
|-
 
 
 
 
 
 
 
  
  
 
 
  
 

Changes:
 Dave Petrie replaced Mary Scanlon. Scanlon resigned as an MSP in April 2006 to contest the Moray by-election following the death of Margaret Ewing. Petrie was next on the Conservative list.

1999 election 
In the 1999 Scottish Parliament election the region elected MSPs as follows:

 5 Liberal Democrat MSPs (all constituency members)
 4 Scottish National Party MSPs (two constituency and two additional members)
 4 Labour MSPs (one constituency and three additional members)
 2 Conservative MSP (both additional members)

Constituency results 
{| class=wikitable
!colspan=4 style=background-color:#f2f2f2|1999 Scottish Parliament election: Highlands and Islands
|-
! colspan=2 style="width: 200px"|Constituency
! style="width: 150px"|Elected member
! style="width: 300px"|Result

Additional member results 
{| class=wikitable
!colspan=8 style=background-color:#f2f2f2|1999 Scottish Parliament election: Highlands and Islands
|-
! colspan="2" style="width: 150px"|Party
! Elected candidates
! style="width: 40px"|Seats
! style="width: 40px"|+/−
! style="width: 50px"|Votes
! style="width: 40px"|%
! style="width: 40px"|+/−%
|-

Footnotes 

Scottish Parliamentary regions
Politics of Moray
Politics of Highland (council area)
Scottish Parliament constituencies and regions 1999–2011
Scottish Parliament constituencies and regions from 2011
Politics of Argyll and Bute
Politics of the Outer Hebrides
Politics of Orkney
Politics of Shetland